Y. Ramavaram is one of the 22 mandals in Alluri Sitharama Raju district of Andhra Pradesh. As per census 2011, there are 137 villages in this mandal.

Demographics 
Y. Ramavaram mandal has total population of 28,614 as per the census 2011 out of which 13,757 are males while 14,857 are females. The average sex ratio of Y. Ramavaram mandal is 1080. The total literacy rate of the mandal is 44%.

Villages 
List of villages in Y. Ramavaram mandal.

Adupulametta
Allurigedda
Ammapeta
Annampalem
Antilova
Babbilova
Bachaluru
Bandigedda
Bheemudugadda
Boddagondi
Boddagunta
Boddapalle
Boddumamidi
Bullojupalem
Buradakota
Buradavalasa
Buruguwada
Busikota
Chamagedda
Chanaganuru
Chaparai
Chavitidibbalu
Chendurthi
Chilakaveedhilanka
Chinavulempadu
Chinta Koyya
Chinthakarrapalem
Chinthalapudi
D Mamidivada
Dabbamamidi
Dadalikavada
Dalipadu
Daragedda
Daralova
Devaramadugula
Donarai
Donkarai
Doragondi
Dorawada
Dubela
Dumpavalasa
Edlakonda
G Vattigedda
Gandempalle
Ganganuru
Gannavaram
Gellavada
Gobbilapanukulu
Godugurayi
Gondikota
Goppulathotamamidi
Goramanda
Gummarapalem
Gurtedu
Irlavada
Jajigedda
Jajivalasa
Jalagalova
Jangalathota
K Yerragonda
Kadarikota
Kakkonda
Kallepugonda
Kanatalabanda
Kanivada
Kappalabanda
Karnikota
Kathirala
Kokitagondi
Komaravaram
Koppulakota
Koramatigondi
Kota
Kotabandichippalamamidi
Kothakota
Kothapakalu
Kunkumamidi
Lingavaram
Mangampadu
Marriguda
Mulasalapalem
Munagalapudi
Muvvalavada
Nagalova
Nakkalapadu
Nakkarathipalem
Neelapalem
Nellikota
Nulakamamidi
Nuvvugantipalem
P Yerragonda
Paidiputta
Palagondi
Panasalapalem
Panasalova
Panchadaralanka
Pasaruginne
Pathakota
Pedavulempadu
Perikivalasa
Polamanugondi
Poolova
Pulimetala
Pulusumamidi
Putikunta
Puttagandi
Puttapalle
Rachapalem
Rakota
Ramulakonda
Ratsavalasa
Ravvagadda
Regadipalem
Revadikota
Sesharai
Simhadripalem
Singanakota
Singavaram
Sirimetla
Thadikota
Thangedukota
Totakurapalem
Tulusuru
Tumikelapadu
Vadisalova
Vanamamidigondi
Vattigedda
Vedullapalle
Veerampalem
Vejuvada
Villarti
Vootlabanda
Y Ramavaram
Yarlagadda
Yerragoppula
Yerramreddipalem

See also 
List of mandals in Andhra Pradesh

References 

Mandals in Alluri Sitharama Raju district